Peng Yue (died April 196 BC), courtesy name Zhong, was a Chinese military general and politician in the late Qin dynasty and early Western Han dynasty. He was involved in the Chu–Han Contention – a power struggle between the Han dynasty's founder, Liu Bang (Emperor Gao), and his rival, Xiang Yu – as an ally of Liu Bang. In recognition of his contributions, Liu Bang granted Peng Yue the title "King of Liang" after the Han dynasty was established.

Life

Uprising
Peng Yue was a native of Changyi (present-day Jinxiang County, Shandong), and was originally a fisherman. Following the Dazexiang Uprising in 209 BC, Peng Yue was nominated by his fellows to be their leader and he led an uprising against the Qin dynasty. Initially, Peng Yue was reluctant to rebel, but obliged eventually and he arranged for his supporters to meet him the next morning. However, his men did not arrive in time and the last one came at noon. Peng Yue said, "Since everyone has chosen me to be the leader, there must be discipline. As there are too many people who were late today, I cannot possibly punish all of them. The last man to arrive will be executed."

Chu-Han Contention
In 205 BC, Peng Yue allied with Liu Bang, the King of Han, and became one of Liu's generals after Liu promised to grant him land and the title of a vassal king. Earlier on, Peng Yue had refused to send his troops to help Liu Bang, that resulted in the latter's defeat by Xiang Yu at the Battle of Guling. Three years later, Peng Yue conquered more than 20 cities around Changyi and acquired a large amount of supplies. He then led his troops southwards and joined the armies of Han Xin and Liu Bang at the Battle of Gaixia against Xiang Yu. Peng Yue's contributed greatly to the eventual Han victory over Xiang Yu. After Liu Bang founded the Han dynasty, Peng Yue was conferred the title of "King of Liang" and granted the lands of former Wei state as his kingdom.

Death
In 196 BC, Liu Bang led an army to suppress a rebellion by Chen Xi, the Marquis of Yangxia, and he requested reinforcements from Peng Yue. Peng Yue claimed to be ill and sent his subordinates to help Liu Bang in place of himself. After Chen Xi's rebellion was quelled, Liu Bang heard rumours that Peng Yue was intending to rebel against him as well, and he had Peng arrested. Peng Yue was demoted to the status of a commoner and exiled to the remote Qingyi County (in present-day Ya'an, Sichuan). Along the way, Peng Yue encountered Empress Lü Zhi, who wanted to have him killed. He pleaded with her to spare his life and let him return home to Changyi, and the empress pretended to agree. Peng Yue was brought back to Luoyang where he was subsequently executed. Empress Lü ordered his clan be put to death as well. Peng Yue's corpse was minced into pieces, salted like meat, and distributed to all the noble families of China, who found this very disturbing.

Legacy
Peng Yue is sometimes venerated as a door god in Chinese and Taoist temples, usually partnered with Ying Bu. He is one of the 32 historical figures who appear as special characters in the video game Romance of the Three Kingdoms XI by Koei.

References

196 BC deaths
Year of birth unknown
2nd-century BC executions
Chinese gods
Chinese princes
Chu–Han contention people
Deified Chinese people
Emperor Gaozu of Han
Executed Han dynasty people
Executed people from Shandong
Han dynasty generals from Shandong
Han dynasty politicians from Shandong
People executed by the Han dynasty by decapitation
Politicians from Heze